Anna Kuzenkova (born 12 March 2001), known professionally as Anna Zak, is a Russian-born Israeli online personality, model, and singer. Her following consists of 4 million followers on TikTok and over 1 million followers on Instagram. She became famous on social media both in Israel and internationally.

Zak is regarded as one of the most influential Israelis online. In 2017, she  ranked number 1 on Israeli youth influencing Instagram Nana 10 , while the Israeli Internet Association ranked her as the overall most influential Israeli Instagrammer.

On August 23, 2017, she officially started her musical career through her debut single "Money Honey", along with a music video.

On January 2, 2022, Anna Zak released her first commercial success song "לך לישון (Lech Lishon (in english, "Go to Sleep")". The music video was released on the same day as the audio and has over 20 million views.

Early and personal life
Anna Kuzenkova was born in Sochi, Russia, to Natalia and Denis Kuzenkov. Her family immigrated to Israel in 2010, when she was nine years old with her parents, her sister, and her grandparents. The family settled in Ashdod, and in a short time she was speaking Hebrew. Her parents later separated, and her father returned to Russia, working on the Sochi Olympics; her older sister served in the Israeli military at that time. Zak attended Mekif Hey High school in Ashdod. The surname "Zak" she uses was selected as a shortened catchy stage name. Her father is Jewish and her mother is Ethnic Russian.

In March 2020, Zak was inducted into the Israel Defense Forces.

As of 2019, she was in a relationship with Israeli singer Roee Sendler. Until they broke up in the end of January 2023.

Modeling and media career 

She began her career in 2014 on Israeli kids reality show The Boys And The Girls.

In 2016, she was chosen to be the face of Scoop Shoes, earning a NIS₪50,000 contract at the age of 15, considered to be a large sum for her age. She has also led a global campaign for hair removal brand Veet. She says that at her school, some of her teachers do not know about her social media career. While still in ninth grade, her monthly income from her social media profile was at least NIS 10,000 (approximately $2,500 USD) excluding her sponsorship deals.

Her large income at her age has raised eyebrows, but she told Israel Channel 2 that her career is supported by her family.

In 2017, she became the host of Music 24's show 'To be a singer'. She also collaborates on social media with model Neta Alchimister.

In 2017, she became the most influential person on Israeli Instagram, according to the Israeli Internet Association. She was also ranked by Nana 10 as the most influential Israeli youth influencing Instagram in 2017.

In June 2017, she was chosen to be the face of Office Depot's back-to-school campaign in Israel.

Now United 

In 2017, she auditioned for Simon Fuller's project Now United, to be part of an international band (with representatives representing  China, India, Russia, Japan, UK, US, Philippines, South Korea, Finland, and Germany). It was later announced that she was chosen to head the project, rather than be one of the singers, which would mean regular flights from Israel to Los Angeles while still in school. She learned that she was supposed to be the band's presenter and did so on one occasion in Russia.

See also
Women in Israel

References

External links 

Anna Zak for ITM Models
Anna Zak profiled on HOT (YouTube)
Anna Zak: Interview on HOT (YouTube)

Israeli female models
21st-century Israeli singers
People from Ashdod
Israeli people of Russian-Jewish descent
Israeli Ashkenazi Jews
Israeli people of Soviet descent
Russian emigrants to Israel
Child models
Living people
2001 births
TikTokers